

Female state supreme court justices

First female justices
Below is a list of the names of the first woman to sit on the highest court of their respective states in the United States.

The first state with a female justice was Ohio; Florence E. Allen was named to the bench in 1923.

Female chief justices

Instances of a female-majority court

Throughout history, men have outnumbered women on the highest court in each state. Instances of female-majority courts remain an uncommon occurrence, but in recent decades they have appeared more frequently. Currently, the United States Supreme Court has the highest percentage of women justices it has ever had, yet there has still never been a majority.

References

 
 Female
State Supreme Court
 Female
State supreme court